Herring gull is a common name for several birds in the genus Larus, all formerly treated as a single species. 

Three species are still combined in some taxonomies:

 American herring gull (Larus smithsonianus) - North America
 European herring gull (Larus argentatus) - Northern Europe
 Vega gull (Larus vegae) - East Asia

Additional species formerly included within this species include:

 Armenian gull (Larus armenicus) - Caucasus and Middle East
 Caspian gull (Larus cachinnans) - Eastern Europe and Central Asia
 Yellow-legged gull (Larus michahellis) - Southern Europe, North Africa and Middle East

Larus
Bird common names